Kim Wraae Knudsen (born 19 September 1977) is a Danish sprint canoer who has competed since the mid-2000s. He won a silver medal in the K-2 1000 m event at the 2008 Summer Olympics in Beijing with Rene Poulsen.

References

1977 births
Canoeists at the 2008 Summer Olympics
Canoeists at the 2012 Summer Olympics
Danish male canoeists
Living people
Olympic canoeists of Denmark
Olympic silver medalists for Denmark
Olympic medalists in canoeing
Medalists at the 2008 Summer Olympics